John Burns (1858–1943) was an English trade unionist, socialist and politician.

John or Jon Burns may also refer to:

Entertainment
John Burns (audio engineer), British recording engineer and producer since the 1960s
John Burns (radio presenter) (born 1945), Australian radio presenter on 3AW, Melbourne
Jake Burns (born 1958), Irish singer and guitarist for Stiff Little Fingers
John M. Burns (born 1938), British comic artist known for his work on Modesty Blaise and Judge Dredd
John Burns (fictional character), a fictional character on the American sitcom Taxi

Military
John Horne Burns (1916–1953), American military intelligence officer and novelist
John L. Burns (1794–1872), American soldier in the War of 1812 and civilian combatant in the Battle of Gettysburg
John M. Burns (sailor) (1835–?), American Civil War sailor and Medal of Honor recipient

Politics
John A. Burns (1909–1975), American delegate and governor of the state of Hawaii
John David Burns (born 1936), American President of the Senate of Oregon State from 1971 to 1973
John Fitzgerald Burns (1833–1911), Australian member of the New South Wales Legislative Assembly
John H. Burns, American Ambassador to Tanzania
John J. Burns (Alaska politician) (born 1959), American Attorney General in Alaska
John J. Burns (New York politician)
John J. Burns (Vermont politician), mayor of Burlington, Vermont
Jon G. Burns (born 1952), American state representative in Georgia

Sports
John Burns (Australian rules footballer) (born 1949), Australian former North Melbourne centreman
John Burns (baseball) (1861–?), American baseball player
John Burns (Irish footballer) (born 1977), Irish footballer
John Burns (Scottish footballer), Scottish professional footballer
John Burns (umpire) (1859–1919), American baseball umpire
John Burns (weightlifter) (born 1948), British Olympic weightlifter
John A. Burns (American football) (1916–1968), American football coach
John Campbell Burns (1880–1941), New Zealand cricketer
Jake Burns (rugby union) (born 1941), New Zealand rugby union player

Others
 John Burns (businessman) (born 1944), British property developer
 John Burns (entomologist), American curator and professor at the Smithsonian Institution
 John Burns (farmer) (1769–1785), youngest brother of the poet Robert Burns.
 John Burns (judge), Australian judge
 John Burns (minister) (1744–1839), Scottish minister
 John Burns (surgeon) (1775–1850), Scottish surgeon
 John Burns, 1st Baron Inverclyde (1829–1901), Scottish ship owner
 John Fisher Burns (born 1944), British foreign correspondent for The New York Times

See also
Burns (surname)
Jack Burns (disambiguation)
John Burn (disambiguation)
John Burns Hynd (1902–1971), British Labour politician
John David Burnes (born 1988), Canadian archer